The Jameson Islands are an island group located in the Coronation Gulf, south of Victoria Island, in the Kitikmeot Region, Nunavut, Canada. Other island groups in the vicinity include the Chapman Islands, Sesqui Islands, and Wilmot Islands.

References 

Islands of Coronation Gulf
Uninhabited islands of Kitikmeot Region